Burnside's Bridge is a landmark on the Civil War Antietam National Battlefield near Sharpsburg, northwestern Maryland.

History

Construction

Seeking to improve connections between roads in Washington County, fourteen bridges were commissioned to be constructed. It is one of five bridges designed by master bridge builder John Weaver, its construction was completed in 1836. It was constructed by local Dunker farmers. The three-arched, -wide, -long bridge provided a passageway over Antietam Creek for farmers to take their produce and livestock to market in Sharpsburg. The bridge's three arches are constructed of locally sourced coursed limestone, masonry walls contain the roadbed and has wooden parapets. The original cost of construction was $3200 (now between $73,000 and $84,000.)

The bridge has two other names, one is "Rohrbach's Bridge", after a local farmer Henry Rohrbach who lived nearby. The second name, "Lower Bridge"  is in reference to the Upper Bridge and Middle Bridge located further upstream that also allowed movement of freight, animals, and people across the creek.

Battle of Antietam

Crossing over Antietam Creek, the bridge played a key role in the September 1862 Battle of Antietam during the American Civil War when around 500 Confederate soldiers from Georgia under General Robert Toombs and Henry Benning, for several hours held off repeated attempts by elements of the Union Army's IX Army Corps, whose leader was Major General Ambrose E. Burnside, to take the bridge.

The first attempt was by Col. George Crook's Ohio brigade, partially supported by Edward Harland's brigade of Rodman's Division, but the Ohioans got lost and emerged too far upstream. The 11th Connecticut Infantry found the bridge, and engaged the Georgians under Brig. Gen. Robert Toombs. After taking heavy casualties, the 11th Connecticut withdrew in all haste.

The second try to carry the bridge was by the 2nd Division's 1st Brigade under James Nagle - the 2nd Maryland & the 6th New Hampshire Infantry rushed to the bridge via a nearby farm road but was stopped by the Georgia sharpshooters before getting halfway to the bridge. Toomb's 450 Georgians held off 14,000 Union attackers.

Finally, the 51st New York Volunteer Infantry and the 51st Pennsylvania Infantry, from Brig. Gen. Edward Ferrero's brigade, attacked from the field on the Union side of the creek, stopped briefly at the walls near the bridge to duel with the sharpshooters, and then charged and seized it, but not before the attack had been delayed for several hours beyond what had been expected.

Landmark

After the war, the U.S. Government acquired the bridge and adjoining land. Vehicular traffic across the bridge was stopped and the original farm lanes allowed to grow over with grass. Foot traffic is still allowed across the structure, at the Antietam National Battlefield. It remains as one of the most photographed bridges of the Civil War. In 1937, the bridge was depicted on the reverse of the Battle of Antietam half dollar.

References

External links

1862 Americanart.si.edu: photo

Landmarks in Maryland
Transportation buildings and structures in Washington County, Maryland
Battle of Antietam
Bridges completed in 1836
Tourist attractions in Washington County, Maryland
Road bridges in Maryland
Pedestrian bridges in Maryland
Former road bridges in the United States
Historic American Buildings Survey in Maryland
Historic American Landscapes Survey in Maryland
1836 establishments in Maryland